Jining railway station is a railway station on the Xinxiang–Yanzhou railway in Rencheng District, Jining, Shandong, China. It opened in 1912 and is a third-class station.

References

Railway stations in Shandong
Railway stations in China opened in 1912
Railway stations in Jining
Stations on the Xinxiang–Yanzhou railway